The 1954–55 daytime network television schedule for the three major English-language commercial broadcast networks in the United States covers the weekday daytime hours from September 1954 to August 1955.

Talk shows are highlighted in yellow, local programming is white, reruns of prime-time programming are orange, game shows are pink, soap operas are chartreuse, news programs are gold and all others are light blue. New series are highlighted in bold.

Fall 1954

Winter 1954-1955

Spring 1955

 formerly Portia Faces Life

Summer 1955

See also
1954-55 United States network television schedule (prime-time)
1954-55 United States network television schedule (late night)

Sources
 https://web.archive.org/web/20071015122215/http://curtalliaume.com/abc_day.html
 https://web.archive.org/web/20071015122235/http://curtalliaume.com/cbs_day.html
 https://web.archive.org/web/20071012211242/http://curtalliaume.com/nbc_day.html
 Castleman & Podrazik, The TV Schedule Book, McGraw-Hill Paperbacks, 1984
 Hyatt, The Encyclopedia Of Daytime Television, Billboard Books, 1997
 TV schedule pages, New York Times, September 1954 – September 1955 (microfilm)

United States weekday network television schedules
1954 in American television
1955 in American television